Aqa Hasan may refer to following,

People
 Malaaz-ul-Ulama Maulana Syed Hasan Naqvi, a mujtahid from Lucknow, India

Places
 Qaleh-ye Aqa Hasan, a village in Iran